Henry Joseph Darger Jr. (April 12, 1892 – April 13, 1973) was an American writer, novelist and artist who worked as a hospital custodian in Chicago, Illinois. He has become famous for his posthumously discovered 15,145-page fantasy novel manuscript called The Story of the Vivian Girls, in What Is Known as the Realms of the Unreal, of the Glandeco-Angelinian War Storm, Caused by the Child Slave Rebellion, along with several hundred drawings and watercolor illustrations for the story.

The visual subject matter of his work ranges from idyllic scenes in Edwardian interiors and tranquil flowered landscapes populated by children and fantastic creatures, to scenes of horrific terror and carnage depicting young children being tortured and massacred. Much of his artwork is mixed media with collage elements. Darger's artwork has become one of the most celebrated examples of outsider art.

Life
Darger was born on April 12, 1892, in Chicago, Illinois, to Henry Darger Sr. and Rosa Fullman. Cook County records show he was born at home, located at 350 W. 24th Street. When he was four years old, his mother died of puerperal fever after giving birth to a daughter, who was given up for adoption; Darger never knew his sister. One of his biographers, the art historian and psychologist John M. MacGregor, discovered that Rosa had two children before Henry, but did not discover their whereabouts.

By Darger's own account, his father was kind and reassuring to him. Darger Sr. was a tailor with disabilities, and his poor health made caring for his son difficult. They lived together until 1900, when his father was taken to St. Augustine's Home for the Aged. Because of his apparent intellect, the young Darger had been enrolled in public school at the third grade level; after his father's hospitalization, Darger was moved to the Mission of Our Lady of Mercy, a Roman Catholic orphanage. After bad behavior, he was relocated to the Illinois Asylum for Feeble-Minded Children in Lincoln, Illinois, also called the Lincoln State School (today the Lincoln Developmental Center), with the diagnosis, according to Stephen Prokopoff, that "little Henry's heart is not in the right place". According to John MacGregor, the diagnosis was actually "self-abuse", a euphemism for masturbation.

Darger himself felt that much of his problem was being able to see through adult lies and becoming a "smart-aleck" as a result, which often led to his being punished by teachers and ganged up on by classmates. He also felt compelled to make unusual noises. The Lincoln asylum's practices included forced child labor and severe punishments, which Darger would later seemingly incorporate into his writing. Darger later said that, to be fair, there were also "good times" at the asylum, he enjoyed some of the work, and he had friends as well as enemies.

In 1908, Darger received word that his father had died in St. Augustine's Home for the Aged; Darger never had a chance to visit him since his departure eight years prior. He attempted to escape in 1908 by freight train, but was thwarted by police after reaching Chicago and forced back into the asylum. He escaped once more in 1909 and succeeded, now free in Chicago.

With the help of his godmother, Darger found menial employment in a Catholic hospital and in this fashion continued to support himself until his retirement in 1963.

Except for a brief stint in the U.S. Army during World War I, his life took on a pattern that seems to have varied little. A devout Catholic, he attended Mass daily, frequently returning for as many as five services. He collected found objects from the streets – including shoes, eyeglasses, and balls of string – to exhibit alongside artwork in his home-studio. His dress was shabby, although he attempted to keep his clothes clean and mended, and he was largely solitary.

His close friend of 48 years, William Schloeder, was of like mind on the subject of protecting abused and neglected children, and the pair proposed founding a "Children's Protective Society" that would put such children up for adoption to loving families. Schloeder left Chicago sometime in the mid-1930s, but he and Darger stayed in touch through letters until Schloeder's death in 1959. Darger's biographer Jim Elledge speculates that Darger and Schloeder may have had a romantic relationship while Schloeder lived in Chicago, and Darger sometimes referred to Schloeder as his "special friend."

In 1930, Darger settled into a second-floor room on Chicago's North Side at 851 W. Webster Avenue in the Lincoln Park section of the city, near the DePaul University campus. It was in this room for the next 43 years that Darger would imagine and write his massive tomes (in addition to a 10-year daily weather journal and assorted diaries) and collect and display artwork until his death at St. Augustine's Home for the Aged (the same institution at which his father had died) on April 13, 1973, one day after his 81st birthday.

In the last entry in his diary, Darger wrote: "January 1, 1971. I had a very poor nothing like Christmas. Never had a good Christmas all my life, nor a good new year, and now... I am very bitter but fortunately not revengeful, though I feel should be how I am..."

Darger is buried at All Saints Cemetery in Des Plaines, Illinois, in a plot called "The Old People of the Little Sisters of the Poor Plot". His headstone is inscribed "Artist" and "Protector of Children".

Works

In the Realms of the Unreal
In the Realms of the Unreal is a 15,145-page work bound in fifteen immense, densely typed volumes (with three of them consisting of several hundred illustrations, scroll-like watercolor paintings on paper derived from magazines and coloring books) created over six decades. Darger illustrated his stories using a technique of traced images cut from magazines and catalogues, arranged in large panoramic landscapes and painted in watercolors, some as large as 30 feet wide and painted on both sides. He wrote himself into the narrative as the children's protector.

The largest part of the book, The Story of the Vivian Girls, in What is Known as the Realms of the Unreal, of the Glandeco-Angelinian War Storm Caused by the Child Slave Rebellion, follows the adventures of the daughters of Robert Vivian, seven princesses of the Christian nation of Abbieannia who assist a daring rebellion against the child slavery imposed by John Manley and the Glandelinians. Children take up arms in their own defense and are often slain in battle or viciously tortured by the Glandelinian overlords. The elaborate mythology includes the setting of a large planet, around which Earth orbits as a moon (where most people are Christian and mostly Catholic), and a species called the "Blengigomeneans" (or Blengins for short), gigantic winged beings with curved horns who occasionally take human or part-human form, even disguising themselves as children. They are usually benevolent, but some Blengins are extremely suspicious of all humans, due to Glandelinian atrocities.

Once released from the Lincoln asylum, Darger repeatedly attempted to adopt a child, but his efforts failed. Images of children often served as his inspiration, particularly a portrait from the Chicago Daily News from May 9, 1911: a five-year-old murder victim, named Elsie Paroubek. The girl had left home on April 8 of that year telling her mother she was going to visit her aunt around the corner from her home. She was last seen listening to an organ grinder with her cousins. Her body was found a month later in a sanitary district channel near the screen guards of the powerhouse at Lockport. An autopsy found she had probably been suffocated—not strangled, as is often stated in articles about Darger. Paroubek's disappearance and murder, her funeral, and the subsequent investigation, were the subjects of a huge amount of coverage in the Daily News and other papers at the time.

This newspaper photo was part of a growing personal archive of clippings Darger had been gathering. There is no indication that the murder or the news photo and article had any particular significance for Darger, until one day he could not find it. Writing in his journal at the time, he began to process this forfeiture of yet another child, lamenting that "the huge disaster and calamity" of his loss "will never be atoned for", but "shall be avenged to the uttermost limit". According to his autobiography, Darger believed the photo was among several items that were stolen when his locker at work was broken into. He never found his copy of the photograph again. Because he could not remember the exact date of its publication, he could not locate it in the newspaper archive. He carried out an elaborate series of novenas and other prayers for the picture to be returned. The fictive war that was sparked by Darger's loss of the newspaper photograph of Paroubek, whose killer was never found, became Darger's magnum opus. He had been working on some version of the novel before this time (he makes reference to an early draft which was also lost or stolen), but now it became an all-consuming creation.

In The Realms of the Unreal, Paroubek is imagined as Annie Aronburg, the leader of the first child slave rebellion. "The assassination of the child labor rebel Annie Aronburg... was the most shocking child murder ever caused by the Glandelinian Government" and was the cause of the war. Through their sufferings, valiant deeds and exemplary holiness, the Vivian Girls are hoped to be able to help bring about a triumph of Christianity. Darger provided two endings to the story, one in which the Vivian Girls and Christianity are triumphant and another in which they are defeated and the godless Glandelinians reign.

Darger's human figures were rendered largely by tracing, collage, or photo enlargement from popular magazines and children's books (much of the "trash" he collected was old magazines and newspapers, which he clipped for source material). Some of his favorite figures were the Coppertone Girl and Little Annie Rooney. He is praised for his natural gift for composition and the brilliant use of color in his watercolors. The images of daring escapes, mighty battles, and painful torture are reminiscent not only of contemporaneous epic films such as The Birth of a Nation (which Darger might easily have seen) but of events in Catholic history; the text makes it clear that the child victims are heroic martyrs like the early saints. Art critic Michael Moon explains Darger's images of tortured children in terms of popular Catholic culture and iconography. These included martyr pageants and Catholic comic books with detailed, often gory tales of innocent female victims.

One idiosyncratic feature of Darger's artwork is that his girl subjects are shown to have penises when unclothed or partially clothed. Darger biographer Jim Elledge speculates that this represents a reflection of Darger's own childhood issues with sexual identity and homosexuality. Darger's second novel, Crazy House, deals with these subjects more explicitly. However this may simply reflect Darger's lack of knowledge of anatomy as girls are always depicted either with no genitalia at all, or with penises.

In a paraphrase of the Declaration of Independence, Darger wrote of children's right "to play, to be happy, and to dream, the right to normal sleep of the night's season, the right to an education, that we may have an equality of opportunity for developing all that are in us of mind and heart."

Crazy House: Further Adventures in Chicago
A second work of fiction, provisionally titled Crazy House: Further Adventures in Chicago, contains over 10,000 handwritten pages. Written after The Realms, it takes that epic's major characters—the seven Vivian sisters and their companion/secret brother, Penrod—and places them in Chicago, with the action unfolding during the same years as that of the earlier book. Begun in 1939, it is a tale of a house that is possessed by demons and haunted by ghosts, or has an evil consciousness of its own. Children disappear into the house and are later found brutally murdered. The Vivians and Penrod are sent to investigate and discover that the murders are the work of evil ghosts. The girls go about exorcising the place, but have to resort to arranging for a full-scale Holy Mass to be held in each room before the house is clean. They do this repeatedly, but it never works. The narrative ends mid-scene, with Darger having just been rescued from the Crazy House.

The History of My Life
In 1968, Darger became interested in tracing some of his frustrations back to his childhood and began writing The History of My Life. Spanning eight volumes, the book only spends 206 pages detailing Darger's early life before veering off into 4,672 pages of fiction about a powerful tornado called "Sweetie Pie", probably inspired by memories of a tornado he had witnessed in 1908.

Posthumous fame and influence

Darger's landlords, Nathan and Kiyoko Lerner, discovered his work shortly before his death. Nathan Lerner, an accomplished photographer whose long career, the New York Times wrote, "was inextricably bound up in the history of visual culture in Chicago," immediately recognized the artistic merit of Darger's work. By this time Darger was in St. Augustine's, operated by the Little Sisters of the Poor, where his father had died.

The Lerners took charge of the Darger estate, publicizing his work and contributing to projects such as the 2004 documentary In the Realms of the Unreal. In cooperation with Kiyoko Lerner, Intuit: The Center for Intuitive and Outsider Art dedicated the Henry Darger Room Collection in 2008 as part of its permanent collection. Darger has become internationally recognized thanks to the efforts of the people who salvaged his work. After Nathan Lerner's death in 1997, Kiyoko became the sole figure in charge of both her husband's and Darger's estates. The U.S. copyright representative for the Estate of Henry Darger and the Estate of Nathan Lerner is the Artists Rights Society.

Darger is today one of the most famous figures in the history of outsider art. At the Outsider Art Fair, held every January in New York City, and at auction, his work is among the highest-priced of any self-taught artist. The American Folk Art Museum in New York opened a Henry Darger Study Center in 2001. His work now commands upwards of $750,000.

Darger left no will and no immediate surviving relatives when he died in 1973. Eventually, distant relatives of Darger began making legal claims to his artwork, alleging that the Lerners did not have title or any other right to benefit from the sale of Darger's work. The dispute is currently in state court in Cook County, Illinois. In June 2022, a probate judge agreed to make one of the distant relatives, Christen Sadowski, "the supervised administrators of the estate," making him "authorized to take possession of and collect the assets of the Estate, including its copyright and personal property interests." Sadowski filed a federal lawsuit against Kiyoko Lerner the following month, seeking possession of Darger's work and associated copyrights.

In popular culture
Since his death in 1973 and the discovery of his magnum opus, and especially since the 1990s, there have been many references in popular culture to Darger's work by other visual artists including, but not limited to, artists of comics and graphic novels; numerous popular songs; a 1999 book-length poem, Girls on the Run, by John Ashbery; a multi-player online game, Sissyfight 2000, and a 2004 multimedia piece by choreographer Pat Graney incorporating Darger images. Jesse Kellerman's 2008 novel, The Genius, took part of its inspiration from Darger's story. Mike Walker and Judith Kampfner's radio play Darger and the Detective, performed by the Steppenwolf Theatre Company for BBC Radio, focuses on Darger's obsessions and a police detective investigating the disappearance of Elsie Paroubek.  Charlie Kaufman's 2020 novel Antkind includes several references to Darger.

These artists have variously drawn from and responded to Darger's artistic style, his themes (especially the Vivian Girls, the young heroines of Darger's massive illustrated novel), and the events in his life.

Jessica Yu's 2004 documentary In the Realms of the Unreal details Darger's life and artworks. Another documentary, Revolutions of the Night by Mark Stokes, looks at Darger's early life and examines lesser-known works by the artist.

Comic book artist Scott McCloud refers to Darger's work in his book Making Comics, while describing the danger artists encounter in the creation of a character's back-story. McCloud says that complicated narratives can easily spin out of control when too much unseen information is built up around the characters.

Darger and his work have been an inspiration for several music artists. The Vivian Girls are an all-girl indie/punk trio from Brooklyn; "Henry Darger" is a song by Natalie Merchant on her album Motherland, "Vivian Girls" is song by the band Wussy on their album Left for Dead. "The Vivian Girls Are Visited in the Night by Saint Dargarius and His Squadron of Benevolent Butterflies" is a song by Sufjan Stevens on his album The Avalanche: Outtakes and Extras from the Illinois Album, "The Story of the Vivian Girls" is a song by Comet Gain on their 2005 album City Fallen Leaves, and "Segue: In the Realms of the Unreal" is song by the band ...And You Will Know Us by the Trail of Dead on their album So Divided, "The Vivian Girls" is a 1979 song by Snakefinger (Philip Lithman Roth) also recorded by the Monks of Doom on their album The Cosmodemonic Telegraph Company, "Vivian Girls" is a song by the band Fucked Up on their album Hidden World, and "Lost Girls" (about Darger's work) is a song by Tilly and the Wall on their album Bottoms of Barrels. On their 1994 album Triple Mania II, San Diego's industrial noise performance outfit Crash Worship reworked several Darger images and screen printed them on a copper foil foldout discfolio; as well as the insert and disc. In 2011, Majical Cloudz released "Childhood's End", a haunting song influenced by Darger's later life. New York jazz pianist Sam Harris's 2014 album Interludes includes a song entitled "The Hermit Darger". The song "April 8th" by indie rock band Neutral Milk Hotel, from their debut studio album On Avery Island, has also been suggested to be heavily inspired by Darger's life, especially on his later years of extreme social reclusion; April 8 was the date on which Elsie Paroubek went missing, and the song appears to imagine a fictional meeting between Paroubek and Darger.

French pop rock and new wave band Indochine paid tribute to Henry Darger in writing the song "Henry Darger" available on their studio album 13 released in September 2017.

Darger is referenced by the character Sergeant Hatred in the cartoon The Venture Bros. in season 4, episode 6 "Self-Medication".

Darger appears as a major supporting character in Elizabeth Hand's novel Curious Toys, set around Chicago's Riverview Park in 1915.

Darger and his work appear prominently in the 2022 novel The Latecomer by Jean Hanff Korelitz.

Collections and exhibits
Darger's works are included in the permanent collections of the Museum of Modern Art and the American Folk Art Museum in New York, Intuit: The Center for Intuitive and Outsider Art, the Art Institute of Chicago, the Chicago Museum of Contemporary Art, the New Orleans Museum of Art, the Milwaukee Art Museum, the Collection de l'art brut, the Walker Art Center, the Irish Museum of Modern Art, the Smithsonian American Art Museum, High Museum of Art, and the Lille Métropole Museum of Modern, Contemporary and Outsider Art in Villeneuve d'Ascq, and the Museum of Old and New Art, in Tasmania; Australia.

Darger's art also has been featured in many notable museum exhibitions, including "The Unreality of Being" exhibit curated by Stephen Prokopoff. It was also seen in "Disasters of War" (P.S. 1, New York, 2000), where it was presented alongside prints from the famous Francisco Goya series The Disasters of War and works derived from these by the British contemporary-art duo Jake and Dinos Chapman. Darger's work has also been shown at the Los Angeles County Museum of Art, the Philadelphia Museum of Art, the Setagaya Art Museum, and the Collection de l'art brut, La Maison Rouge, Museum Kunstpalast, Musée d'Art Moderne de Lille-Métropole, and the Yerba Buena Center for the Arts.

In 2008, the exhibition at the American Folk Art Museum, titled "Dargerism: Contemporary Artists and Henry Darger", examined the influence of Darger's œuvre on 11 artists, including Trenton Doyle Hancock, Robyn O'Neil and Amy Cutler, who were responding not only to the aesthetic nature of Darger's mythic work – with its tales of good versus evil, its epic scope and complexity, and its transgressive undertone – but also to his driven work ethic and all-consuming devotion to artmaking.

Also in 2008, Intuit: The Center for Intuitive and Outsider Art in Chicago opened its permanent exhibit of the Henry Darger Room Collection, an installation that meticulously recreates the small northside Chicago apartment where Darger lived and made his art.

See also
James Hampton, another janitor outsider artist who became famous posthumously
Charles Dellschau

Citations

General and cited sources 
 Anderson, Brooke Davis. Darger: The Henry Darger Collection at the American Folk Art Museum. New York: American Folk Art Museum in association with Harry N. Abrams, Inc., 2001.
 Ashbery, John. ''Girls on the Run: A Poem. New York: Farrar Straus and Giroux, 1999.
 Bonesteel, Michael (ed.). Henry Darger: Art and Selected Writings. New York: Rizzoli, 2000.
 Bourrit, Bernard. Henry Darger: Espace mouvant. In "La Part de l'Oeil" n° 20, Bruxelles, 2005: 252–259.
 Collins, Paul, Not Even Wrong: Adventures in Autism. New York: Bloomsbury, 2004. .
 
 Jones, Finn-Olaf, "Landlord's Fantasy", Forbes, April 25, 2005.
 Kitajima, Keizo (photographs), and Koide, Yukiko and Tsuzukimota, Kyoichi (text), Henry Darger's Room: 851 Webster. Tokyo, Japan: Imperial Press, 2007.
 MacGregor, John M. Henry Darger: In the Realms of the Unreal. New York: Delano Greenidge Editions, 2002. .
 Morrison, C. L. The Old Man in the Polka-Dotted Dress: Looking for Henry Darger. New York: Farrar Straus and Giroux, 2005.
 Schjeldahl, Peter. Folks, The New Yorker, January 14, 2002: 88–89.
 Peter Schjeldahl's illustrated review of an exhibit of Darger's art at the American Folk Art Museum in New York City.
 Shaw, Lytle, The Moral Storm: Henry Darger's "Book of Weather Reports", Cabinet. An examination of Darger's 10-year weather diaries and their relation to his work and to Christian painting.
 William Swislow's review of "Henry Darger: Desperate and Terrible Questions", The Outsider.
 Perry, Grayson, and Jones, Wendy, Grayson Perry: Portrait of the Artist as a Young Girl. Vintage, 2007. .
 Trent, Mary. "'Many Stirring Scenes': Henry Darger's Reworking of American Visual Culture." American Art 26 (Spring 2012), 74–101.

External links
 American Folk Art Museum's Henry Darger Collection
 Intuit: The Center for Intuitive and Outsider Art. Website of Chicago art center that features Henry Darger Room Collection on permanent display.
 Sara Ayers' Henry Darger Page.
 Carl Hammer Gallery page, includes a lot of illustrations
 Dargerism: Contemporary Artists and Henry Darger - American Folk Art Museum exhibit about Darger
 Elizabeth Hand, "Inside Out" in The Magazine of Fantasy and Science Fiction, October/November 2002. Compares Darger with J. R. R. Tolkien, pointing out many similarities in their lives.
 Interesting Ideas, Henry Darger: Desperate and Terrible Questions Detailed review of two key Darger books, including an analysis of MacGregor's speculations about Darger's psychology. Photo of Darger's workspace.
 Nathaniel Rich, for The New Republic''
 Stephen Romano Gallery. This site contains many images of Darger's work and links to other Darger-related sites and has Darger work available for sale.
 Revolutions of the Night: The Enigma of Henry Darger—Documentary by Mark Stokes.
 Leo Segedin: "Henry Darger: The Inside of an Outsider", arguing against Darger's classification as an "outsider artist" by setting the term "outsider art" in its proper historical context.

1892 births
1973 deaths
20th-century American male writers
20th-century American non-fiction writers
20th-century American novelists
20th-century American painters
20th-century diarists
American Roman Catholics
American collage artists
American diarists
American fantasy writers
American male non-fiction writers
American male novelists
American science fiction writers
American speculative fiction artists
Artists from Chicago
Fantastic art
Janitors
Naïve painters
Novelists from Illinois
Outsider artists
Self-taught artists
United States Army personnel of World War I
United States Army soldiers
Writers from Chicago
Writers who illustrated their own writing